The biospheric model of personality is a contribution to the psychology of personality proposed by Andras Angyal in 1941. According to this model, the biosphere is the system of the individual and her environment, consisting of Subject subsystem (the individual) and Object subsystem (the environment).

Description

The following outlines the author's holistic view of the biosphere:
The Subject pole:
Elements: attitude, drive, craving;

Organized into: axioms of behavior, systems of axioms, the personal system principle.

The Object pole:
Elements: relevance, valence, demand quality;

Organized into: axiomatic values, systems of values, the environment's system.

Angyal describes three personality dimensions:
vertical dimension, with surface behavior and deep attitudes that guide that behavior;
progressive dimension, which is the series of behaviors that lead to attaining a goal;
transverse dimension, which is the simultaneous coordination of elementary behaviors into complex acts.

Biosphere dynamics is generated by the tension between the poles of each dimension. There are two fundamental tendencies of the person in relationship with her environment:
autonomy, or domination of the environment by the person;
homonymy, or the adjustment of the person to the environment.

Psychopathology
According to Angyal's model, psychopathology is caused by the segregation of the two poles of one or more personality dimensions. This segregation can be:
vertical, between attitudes and behavior, leading to deceptive behavior;
progressive, between goals and means to attain them, leading to frustration;
transverse, leading to behavior dissociation and incoherence (encountered in psychosis).

See also
Cognitive-affective personality system
Hypostatic model of personality
Personality systematics
Systems psychology
Organismic theory

References
 

Personality theories